Hill Grove School is a historic school for African American children located at Hurt, Pittsylvania County, Virginia. It was built in 1915, and is a small, simple single-story, weatherboarded, light-frame building on a fieldstone foundation, with a low-pitched side-gable roof.  It features a single-bay, tin-covered, shed roof porch
supported by two-by-four lumber over the entrance.  The school closed in the early 1960s.

It was listed on the National Register of Historic Places in 2004.

References

African-American history of Virginia
School buildings on the National Register of Historic Places in Virginia
School buildings completed in 1915
Buildings and structures in Pittsylvania County, Virginia
National Register of Historic Places in Pittsylvania County, Virginia
1915 establishments in Virginia